Iván Garcés (born 24 May 1966) is an Ecuadorian former wrestler who competed in the 1984 Summer Olympics.

References

External links
 

1966 births
Living people
Ecuadorian male sport wrestlers
Olympic wrestlers of Ecuador
Wrestlers at the 1984 Summer Olympics